A list of films produced in Pakistan in 1986 (see 1986 in film) and in the Urdu language:

1986

See also
1986 in Pakistan

External links
 Search Pakistani film - IMDB.com

1986
Pakistani
Films